Jane Frazier or Fraser was a woman captured by Native Americans in the 18th century. She lived in a log house built in 1754 just beyond the Cumberland, Province of Maryland city limits. On October 1, 1755, while returning to her home from the Fort Cumberland Trading Post several miles away, Jane was captured by Native Americans and taken to the Miami River in Ohio. She escaped and returned 18 months later to learn that her husband John had remarried because he thought that she was dead. Jane’s husband took her back and sent his second wife home to her father.

Ruby Frazier Frey, a descendant, wrote a book called Red Morning telling of Jane’s experiences. The Frazier house was destroyed in the 1960s, but a marker designates its location. The former Jane Frazier house was on Route 51, Cumberland, Maryland.

Jane Frazier (formerly Jane Bell and Jane McClain) was born January 1, 1735, in Winchester, Virginia, and died April 14, 1815, in Schellsburg, (Bedford Co.) Pennsylvania. In 1754 she married John Fraser (born in 1721 in the Highlands of Scotland, died April 16, 1773, in Bedford, Pennsylvania) and moved to Tibbitts Creek in Maryland. In 1759, John and Jane Fraser moved near Fort Bedford. They had eight children: Benjamin, Margaret, William, James, Jane, Catherine, Mary, and Amelia. After the death of John Fraser, Jane married Richard DeKapt1 (which became Dunlap) and had one daughter: Agnes.

References
 Edward C. Papenfuse et al.,  Maryland: A New Guide to the Old Line State, Johns Hopkins University 1999, .
 Ruby Frazier Frey, Red Morning, G.P. Putnam's Sons 1946, ASIN B0007DQ41Y, LC Control Number 46006088.
 "The Old Pike Post", Genealogical Society of Allegany County, Maryland, Vol. 16, No. 3 September 1999.
1 Richard Delapt is the correct reading of DeKapt.  See Orphan's Court Records, Bedford County, Pennsylvania, Docket 2, p. 23.

Cumberland, Maryland
People from Cumberland, Maryland
1735 births
1815 deaths
Captives of Native Americans